Jones Victor Mawulorm Dotse is a Supreme Court judge of the Republic of Ghana and The Gambia.

Early life and education 
Jones Dotse was born  in the Volta Region in 1953. He attended Kpando Secondary School from 1966 to 1971 and was educated at Accra Academy from 1971 to 1973. He studied law at the University of Ghana, Legon, graduating in June 1976 and was called to the Ghanaian Bar in November 1978.

Working life
Dotse worked as a State Attorney with the Attorney-General's Department from 1979 to 1981. After this stint, he went into private practice. He served as the President of the Volta Region Bar of the Ghana Bar Association. He became a high court judge in June 2002 and became a judge in the Court of Appeals on 16 September 2003.

He was sworn in as a Justice of the Supreme Court of the Gambia in February 2008 and in June of that same year became a Justice of the Supreme Court of Ghana. He has attended and led courses and seminars in several countries including the United States, Canada, Nigeria, Liberia and Ghana. He also served as the Chairman of the Governing Board of the Judicial Training Institute in Accra.  
 
Jones Dotse is the chairman of the university council of the University of Health and Allied Sciences in Ho.

Personal life 
Dotse is married with three children.

See also
List of judges of the Supreme Court of Ghana
Supreme Court of Ghana

References

Living people
Alumni of the Accra Academy
Justices of the Supreme Court of Ghana
21st-century Ghanaian judges
University of Ghana alumni
1953 births